Hydroxyflutamide (HF, OHF) (developmental code name SCH-16423), or 2-hydroxyflutamide, is a nonsteroidal antiandrogen (NSAA) and the major active metabolite of flutamide, which is considered to be a prodrug of hydroxyflutamide as the active form. It has been reported to possess an IC50 of 700 nM for the androgen receptor (AR), which is about 4-fold less than that of bicalutamide.

References

Anilides
Human drug metabolites
Nitrobenzenes
Nonsteroidal antiandrogens
Trifluoromethyl compounds